Louis Van Der Herten (1904–1982) was a Belgian wrestler. He competed in the men's freestyle middleweight at the 1928 Summer Olympics.

References

External links

1904 births
1982 deaths
Belgian male sport wrestlers
Olympic wrestlers of Belgium
Wrestlers at the 1928 Summer Olympics
Place of birth missing
20th-century Belgian people